Matt Clark is a Canadian former football player who played for the BC Lions and the Edmonton Eskimos. He played from 1991 to 1998, played with famous quarterback Doug Flutie, and was named a Canadian Football League All-Star one time.

Professional career 
Matt Clark went to the University of Montana. Clark's first season with the CFL was 1991.  He wore the number eighty-five.  In his first season, he was named a CFL All-Star along with his teammates: Doug Flutie, Ray Alexander, Leo Groenewegen, and Jim Mills (gridiron football).  In 1994, the BC Lions topped all of the CFL and won the Grey Cup.  Matt Clark finished his professional career in 1998, playing just one game for the Edmonton Eskimos.

References

Year of birth missing (living people)
Living people
BC Lions players
Edmonton Elks players
Canadian football wide receivers
American football wide receivers
Montana Grizzlies football players